Gitit is an Israeli settlement in the West Bank, organized as a moshav.

The international community considers Israeli settlements in the West Bank illegal under international law, but the Israeli government disputes this.

History
According to ARIJ,  Israel  confiscated 514 dunams of land from the Palestinian village of Al-Jiftlik in order to construct Gitit in addition to 1,085 dunums from Aqraba for Gitit and Itamar.

The village was established in 1972 as a Nahal settlement. It is named for a musical instrument mentioned in the Bible with a similar shape as the area: f.e. Psalm 8:1.

In 1975 it became a civilian community affiliated with Mishkei Herut Beitar. In 1978 it became a moshav shitufi, but later reverted to moshav ovdim status.

References

External links
Village website
 Primary documents on the establishment of Gitit at Akevot

Moshavim
Nahal settlements
Israeli settlements in the West Bank
Populated places established in 1972
1972 establishments in the Israeli Military Governorate